Dina Wadia (born Dina Jinnah; August 15, 1919November 2, 2017) was the daughter of Muhammad Ali Jinnah, the founding father of Pakistan and Rattanbai Petit. She belonged to the prominent Jinnah family through her father, the Petit family through her mother, and to the Wadia family through her marriage to Neville Wadia.

Early life and background

Dina was born in London, shortly after midnight, on 15 August 1919, to the founder of Pakistan, Muhammad Ali Jinnah (often formally referred to as "Quaid-i-Azam"), and his second wife, Rattanbai Petit (whose name was legally amended to "Maryam Jinnah" after her conversion to Islam and marriage, though she did not use her new name). As Stanley Wolpert's Jinnah of Pakistan records: "Oddly enough, precisely twenty-eight years to the day and hour before the birth of Jinnah's other offspring, Pakistan". Her premature arrival was unexpected — her parents were at the theatre, but "were obliged to leave their box hurriedly." She was reported to be "a dark-eyed beauty, lithe and winsome, with a smile like her mother's."

Dina's paternal family were upstart merchants of high social status. Dina's paternal grandfather, Jinnah bhai Poonja, was a merchant who hailed from Gondal in Kathiawar, Gujarat, and had moved to Karachi in the mid-1870s. He had made money, but only a few of his many children managed to complete school. Nevertheless, he had been able to send one of his more academically promising sons, Jinnah, to England for higher education. The family belonged to the Ismaili sect of Shia Muslims who are followers of the Aga Khan, and to the Lohana caste, that is, they were Lohana Hindus who had converted to Islam centuries earlier. Dina's father, Jinnah, was the leader of the Pakistan movement and the founder of Pakistan. After he had achieved the partition of India on religious basis and secured the creation of Pakistan as the homeland of British India's Muslims, Jinnah became the first Governor General of Pakistan. He was bestowed with the title Quaid-i-Azam or "Great Leader".

Dina's maternal family was different from her paternal family in religion and in social background. The Petit family were rich, titled, well educated and highly westernized. They belonged to the Parsi community and followed the Zoroastrian faith. Dina's great-grandfather, Dinshaw Maneckji Petit, had founded the first cotton mill in India. This and many other contributions to industry, trade and philanthropy had earned him a baronetcy. Dina's mother, Rattanbai ("Ruttie") was the daughter of the second baronet. The third baronet, Dina's maternal uncle, was married to Sylla Tata, sister of JRD Tata; the Tata family were the richest in India. The Petit family disowned Dina's mother, Rattanbai, when she married Jinnah, who was twenty-four years older than her.

Dina's parents were mismatched not only in age and religion, but also in habits, temperament and views. They separated shortly after Dina's birth, and Ruttie began living in the Taj Mahal Palace Hotel in Mumbai along with her infant daughter, Dina. After Ruttie's death in 1929, Jinnah's sister Fatima moved in with Jinnah to help raise her niece Dina, then 10 years old. Jinnah raised his daughter as a Muslim. According to Jinnah's chauffeur, Bradbury, Jinnah asked his sister, Fatima, "to teach her niece, Dina, about Islam and The Holy Qur'an". During Jinnah's time in London, during 193033, Wolpert commented, "Dina was [Jinnah's] sole comfort, but Dina was away at school most of the time and home only for brief times, yet still the pampered daughter could be a joy to her doting father". In November 1932, Jinnah read H. C. Armstrong's biography of Kemal Atatürk, Grey Wolf, and seemed to have found his own reflection in the story of Turkey's great modernist leader. It was all he talked about for a while at home, even to Dina, who consequently nicknamed him "Grey Wolf".

Marriage, rift and reconciliation with father

Wadia's relationship with her father became strained when she expressed her desire to marry the Parsi-born Indian Neville Wadia who was the son of Sir Ness Wadia and Evelyne Clara Powell. Jinnah, a Muslim, tried to dissuade her, but failed. M. C. Chagla, who was Jinnah's assistant at the time, recalls: "Jinnah, in his usual imperious manner, told her that there were millions of Muslim boys in India, and she could have chosen anyone. Reminding her father that his wife (Dina's mother Rattanbai), had also been a non-Muslim and a Parsi as well, the young lady replied: 'Father, there were millions of Muslim girls in India. Why did you not marry one of them?' And he replied that, 'She became a Muslim'."

Jinnah's then associate and later a prominent judge M. C. Chagla recounts in his autobiography Roses in December that when Dina married Neville, Jinnah said to her that she was not his daughter any more. This story, however, is contentious as some say that Jinnah had sent a bouquet through his driver, Abdul Hai, to the newly married couple. Their relationship is a matter of legal conjecture as Pakistani laws allow for a person to be disinherited for violating Islamic rules (in this case by a Muslim woman marrying a non-Muslim), and hence no claim of hers was entertained on the Pakistani properties of Jinnah. The Wadias lived in Bombay and had two children, a boy named Nusli and a girl named Diana N Wadia. The marriage did not last long, however, and she separated from Wadia in 1943; the couple never formally divorced because divorce was illegal in India at the time.

Following the marriage, the father-daughter relationship became extremely formal and he addressed her formally as 'Mrs. Wadia'. This too is contentious as Dina rebuffed this information calling it a rumour. In an interview with Hamid Mir, she said: "My father was not a demonstrative man but he was an affectionate father. My last meeting with him took place in Bombay in 1946. When I was about to depart, my father hugged Nusli (who was two years old then). The grey cap (Jinnah was wearing) caught Nusli’s fancy and in a moment my father put it on Nusli’s head saying, 'Keep it my boy'."

After the death of Dina Wadia, her personal diary revealed that her relationship with her father was no more formal, and they had reunited as a family. The diary also revealed that Dina had visited Pakistan twice, once on her father's death, and then again for the 2004 India-Pakistan cricket match. She had been in regular touch with her aunt, Fatima Jinnah, who had raised her. On April 28, 1947, In one of her letters to her father Jinnah, Dina had said:

"My darling Papa, First of all I must congratulate you — you got Pakistan….how hard you have worked for it…I do hope you are keeping well — I get lots of news of you from the local  newspapers in Bombay. The children are just recovering from their whooping cough, it will take another month yet. I am taking them to Juhu on Thursday for a month or so. Are you coming back here? If so I hope you will drive out to Juhu and spend the day if you like. Anyway I have a phone so I will ring you up and drive in to see you if you don’t feel like coming out. Take care of yourself Papa darling. Lots of love & kisses, Dina."

South Court mansion in Mumbai
After Jinnah returned to Mumbai from England to take charge of the Muslim League, he built himself a palatial mansion South Court (informally called "Jinnah House") in Mumbai, which became his residence during the politically momentous decade preceding the creation of Pakistan.

After partition in 1947, the 2.5 acres (10,000 m2) property, "South Court", overlooking the sea and located at 2, Bhausaheb Hirey Marg, Malabar Hill, was classified as evacuee property. 
In 1948, it was subsequently leased to the British Deputy High Commission which occupied it until 1982. Pakistan had since 1979 requested that India sell the property, or at least lease it to its government as a tribute to its founder in order to convert it into their Consulate. Though P. V. Narasimha Rao, India's foreign minister in 1980, agreed in principle to lease Jinnah House as the residence of local Consulate-General of Pakistan, the plan was never realised.

During his visit to India, then Pakistani President Pervez Musharraf had suggested to the then Indian Prime Minister Atal Bihari Vajpayee that the house be given to Pakistan so that it could be turned into a consulate. Talks in June 2004 between the foreign ministers of the two countries over the land did not gain any guarantees from India. In May 2005, Pakistan High Commission officials were shown around various properties in Mumbai and its suburbs for the setting up of its consulate but not the Jinnah House. Indian government sources say that the claim by the Jinnah's heirs will be treated "sympathetically", and have no intention of handing it to Pakistan. 

Dina Wadia, the only child of Jinnah, was involved in litigation regarding Jinnah House claiming that Hindu Law is applicable to Jinnah as he was a Khoja Shia.

It was also campaigned to make Jinnah House, India-Pakistan Friendship Centre by a group of peace activists from Mumbai and Karachi. In 2007, Dina Wadia filed a writ petition before the Bombay High Court, claiming that Jinnah House could not be classified as "evacuee property", as her father had died without leaving behind a will and demanded that the house be handed over to her.

Visit to Pakistan in 2004
In March 2004, Wadia visited Lahore, Pakistan, to watch a cricket match between Pakistan and India. She considered "cricket diplomacy" to be an enthralling dimension that illustrated an entirely new phase in relations between India and Pakistan. But she and her son Nusli Wadia chose not to share their thoughts with the public on what was certainly a highly emotional encounter. Wadia had not traveled to Pakistan since her father's funeral in September 1948.

Wadia, her son Nusli Wadia and grandsons Ness Wadia and Jehangir Wadia also visited the mausoleum of her father to pay homage. In the visitors' book, Wadia wrote: "This has been very sad and wonderful for me. May his dream for Pakistan come true." Reports said that she asked for copies of three pictures she saw in the mausoleum's antiquities room. In one picture, she is standing with her father and aunt, Fatima Jinnah. The other is a painting of her mother, Rattanbai Jinnah. In the third, her father is dictating a letter, showing Mohammad Ali Jinnah's political persona. Dina also went to the tomb of Madar-e-Millat Fatima Jinnah to pay respects to her aunt, to the Flagstaff House Pakistan to hoist the flag of Pakistan, and to her father's house Wazir Mansion.

Death
Dina died from pneumonia at her home in Madison Avenue in New York City on 2 November 2017, at the age of 98. Her death was deeply mourned by the people of Pakistan, and was described as the "nation's grief". Several political leaders, including the then Prime Minister and President of Pakistan issued official statements on her death, and later said that she was "greatly respected and admired in Pakistan". The Sindh Assembly in Pakistan observed a one-minute silence in her remembrance and offered Al-Fatiha for her and her father's departed soul. Dina was survived by her son and Wadia group chairman Nusli Wadia, daughter Diana Wadia, and grandsons Ness Wadia and Jehangir Wadia.

References

Further reading
 Chagla, M. C. Individual and the State, Asia Publishing House, 1961
 Wolpert, Stanley Jinnah of Pakistan, Oxford University Press, 1984, 
 Ahmed, Akbar S. Jinnah, Pakistan and Islamic Identity: The Search for Saladin, Routledge, 1997,

External links
 Government of Pakistan's Official Website About Quaid-e-Azam Muhammad Ali Jinnah – noker shan ka 
 A journalist's account of meeting Dina Wadia in New York in 2002

1919 births
2017 deaths
Parsi people
Khoja Ismailism
Indian Ismailis
Gujarati people
Indian emigrants to the United States
Indian Muslims
Jinnah family
People from London
People from New York City
Indian expatriates in the United Kingdom
Wadia family